The superior phrenic arteries are small and arise from the lower part of the thoracic aorta. They are distributed to the posterior part of the upper surface of the diaphragm, and anastomose with the musculophrenic and pericardiacophrenic arteries.

See also
 Inferior phrenic arteries

References

Arteries of the thorax